CKI may refer to

Cheung Kong Infrastructure Holdings
Circle K International
Cook Islands, UNDP code
Croker Island Airport, IATA airport code
Cyclin-dependent kinase inhibitor protein
Crusader Kings, the first installment in Paradox Interactive's Crusader Kings video game series